Franco Ferreiro and Ricardo Mello are the defending champions. Mello decided not to participate this year.
Ferreiro competed with André Sá and they won this year's edition after beating Rui Machado and Daniel Muñoz-de la Nava 3–6, 7–6(2), [10–8] in the final.

Seeds

Draw

Draw

External links
 Main Draw

Copa Petrobras Sao Paulo - Doubles
Copa Petrobras São Paulo